Lochner v. New York, 198 U.S. 45 (1905), was a landmark decision of the U.S. Supreme Court holding that a New York State statute that prescribed maximum working hours for bakers violated the bakers' right to freedom of contract under the Fourteenth Amendment to the U.S. Constitution. The decision has been effectively overturned.

The underlying case began in 1899 when Joseph Lochner, a German immigrant who owned a bakery in Utica, New York, was charged with violating New York's Bakeshop Act of 1895. The Bakeshop Act had made it a crime for New York bakeries to employ bakers for more than 10 hours per day or 60 hours per week. He was convicted and ultimately appealed to the U.S. Supreme Court. A five-justice majority of the Supreme Court held that the law violated the Due Process Clause, stating that the law constituted an "unreasonable, unnecessary and arbitrary interference with the right and liberty of the individual to contract". Four dissenting justices rejected that view, and the dissent of Oliver Wendell Holmes Jr., in particular, became one of the most famous opinions in U.S. history.

Lochner is one of the most controversial decisions in the Supreme Court's history and gave the name to what is known as the Lochner era. During that time, the Supreme Court issued several decisions invalidating federal and state statutes that sought to regulate working conditions during the Progressive Era and the Great Depression. The period ended with West Coast Hotel Co. v. Parrish (1937), in which the Supreme Court upheld the constitutionality of minimum wage legislation enacted by Washington State.

Background
Joseph Lochner was a German immigrant who owned a bakery in Utica, New York in the late 19th century. Unlike other bakeries, which used two separate shifts for evening and morning work, Lochner's bakery employed only a single crew of bakers. His bakers would arrive in the evening and prepare the bread dough, sleep for several hours in an on-site dormitory, then wake up in the early morning and bake the loaves of bread. Lochner counted his bakers' time spent sleeping in the dormitory as working hours and paid them accordingly. This practice violated New York's Bakeshop Act of 1895, which made it a crime for bakeries to employ workers for more than 10 hours per day or 60 hours per week.

In 1899, New York authorities indicted Lochner on a criminal charge of violating the Bakeshop Act by wrongfully and unlawfully permitting an employee to work more than 60 hours in one week. At his trial, Lochner's lawyer argued the right to contract freely to be one of the rights encompassed by substantive due process. Lochner's case was argued by Henry Weismann, who had been one of the foremost advocates of the Bakeshop Act when he was Secretary of the Journeymen Bakers' Union. In his brief, Weismann decried the idea that "the treasured freedom of the individual... should be swept away under the guise of the police power of the State." He denied New York's argument that the Bakeshop Act was a necessary health measure by claiming that the "average bakery of the present day is well ventilated, comfortable both summer and winter, and always sweet smelling." Weismann's brief contained an appendix providing statistics showing that bakers' mortality rates were comparable to that of white-collar professionals. 

But Weismann's arguments were unsuccessful. The trial court found Lochner guilty and fined him $50. Lochner appealed to the New York Supreme Court, Appellate Division, which affirmed his conviction, then appealed to the New York Court of Appeals, which also affirmed it. He then appealed to the U.S. Supreme Court.

Supreme Court decision
On April 17, 1905, the Supreme Court issued a 5–4 decision in favor of Lochner that struck down the New York Bakeshop Act's limits on bakers' working hours as unconstitutional.

Opinion of the Court
 
Five justices formed the majority and joined an opinion written by Justice Rufus Peckham. 

The Court began with the question of whether the Fourteenth Amendment's protections applied to freedom of contract. Citing its 1897 decision Allgeyer v. Louisiana, in which it had struck down a Louisiana law that banned buying shipping insurance from companies in other states on grounds that it violated the freedom to make contracts to carry out a trade or profession, the Court held that freedom of contract was a basic right covered by the protections for "life, liberty, and property" in the Fourteenth Amendment's Due Process Clause.

The Court explained that by "circumstances which exclude the right", it meant when states passed laws under the "police power"the inherent authority of U.S. state governments to pass laws governing "health, safety, and morals". The Court said that because the Due Process Clause protected freedom of contract, state laws could only interfere with it if they were valid exercises of the police power.  To guarantee this freedom, the Court said that American courts had to scrutinize state laws regulating economic freedom, such as New York's bakery law, to ensure they served valid police-power purposes.

Applying these legal principles to the facts of the case, the Court first determined that bakers' jobs were not dangerous enough to need special government protection. The Court distinguished New York's law for bakers from a Utah law for miners the Court had upheld against a Due Process challenge in its 1898 decision Holden v. Hardy, saying that, unlike mining, baking was not an unusually dangerous activity. The Court also determined that the Bakeshop Act had no relation to public health. Reasoning that the New York Legislature could not rationally have enacted the law for health reasons, the Court concluded that the Act was really a "labor law" that could not be justified under the police power.

The Court concluded that New York had failed to prove that the Bakeshop Act's maximum-hours provision had any close connection to public health. It said that if it were to conclude otherwise, states would have unlimited power over citizens' lives.

Lastly, the Court said that state laws ostensibly enacted for police-power purposes were often really intended to redistribute wealth or help a certain group at the expense of others.

Having determined that Bakeshop Act had no relation to public health and that the baking profession was not unusually dangerous, the Court concluded that "the limit of the police power has been reached and passed in this case", and it struck down the act as a violation of the Fourteenth Amendment's Due Process Clause.

Dissents

Harlan

Justice John Marshall Harlan wrote a dissenting opinion that was joined by Justices Edward Douglass White and William R. Day.

Harlan contended that the liberty to contract is subject to regulation imposed by a state acting within the scope of its police powers. He offered the following rule for determining whether such statutes are unconstitutional:

Harlan asserted that the burden of proof should rest with the party seeking to have such a statute deemed unconstitutional.

Harlan argued that the Court gave insufficient weight to the state's argument that the law was a valid health measure addressing a legitimate state interest. He contended that it was "plain that this statute was enacted to protect the physical well-being of those who work in bakery and confectionery establishments." Responding to the majority's assertion that the profession of a baker was not an unhealthy one, he quoted at length from academic studies describing the respiratory ailments and other risks that bakers faced. He argued that the Supreme Court should have deferred to the New York Legislature's judgment that long working hours threatened the health of bakery employees: "If the end which the legislature seeks to accomplish be one to which its power extends, and if the means employed to that end, although not the wisest or best, are yet not plainly and palpably unauthorized by law, then the court cannot interfere."

Holmes

Justice Oliver Wendell Holmes Jr. also dissented from the Court's decision, and his three-paragraph dissent has become one of the most famous in U.S. Supreme Court history. Holmes began by accusing the majority of deciding Lochner's case by following laissez-faire economics rather than legal principles.

Holmes pointed out that there were many American laws restricting citizens' freedom of contract that had never been found unconstitutional. As "ancient examples", Holmes pointed to usury laws, which set maximum interest rates for loans of money, and Sunday laws, which outlawed certain economic activities on Sundays to promote Christian observance of the Sabbath. Holmes analogized the majority's interpretation of the Fourteenth Amendment to the writings of Herbert Spencer, the 19th-century British sociologist who coined the term "survival of the fittest" and whose ideas later became associated with social Darwinism.

Holmes wrote that, in his view, a duly enacted state law could only be unconstitutional under the Due Process Clause's guarantee of liberty if it could rationally be said to "infringe fundamental principles" in the American tradition, and he maintained that the Bakeshop Act clearly did not do so.

Significance and legacy

The Supreme Court's due process jurisprudence over the next three decades was inconsistent, but it took a narrow view of states' police powers in several major labor cases after Lochner. For example, in Coppage v. Kansas (1915), the Court struck down statutes forbidding "yellow-dog contracts." Similarly, in Adkins v. Children's Hospital (1923), the Supreme Court held that minimum wage laws violated the due process clause, but Chief Justice William Howard Taft strongly dissented and suggested that the Court instead should have overruled Lochner. The doctrine of substantive due process was coupled with a narrow interpretation of congressional power under the commerce clause. Justices James McReynolds, George Sutherland, Willis Van Devanter, and Pierce Butler emerged during the 1920s and the 1930s as the foremost defenders of traditional limitations on government power on the Supreme Court and so were collectively dubbed by supporters of the New Deal the "Four Horsemen of Reaction." All four of them believed in laissez-faire economics.

In 1934, the Supreme Court decided in Nebbia v. New York that there is no constitutional fundamental right to freedom of contract. In 1937, the Supreme Court decided West Coast Hotel Co. v. Parrish, which expressly overruled Adkins and implicitly signaled the end of the Lochner era by repudiating the idea that freedom of contract should be unrestricted.

Although the Supreme Court did not explicitly overrule Lochner, it agreed to give more deference to the decisions of state legislatures. The Supreme Court sounded the death knell for economic substantive due process several years later in Williamson v. Lee Optical of Oklahoma (1955) by unanimously declaring, "The day is gone when this Court uses the Due Process Clause of the Fourteenth Amendment to strike down state laws, regulatory of business and industrial conditions, because they may be unwise, improvident, or out of harmony with a particular school of thought."

Modern substantive due process
Since the end of the Lochner era, the Supreme Court has applied a lower standard of review to confront restrictions on economic liberty. A higher standard is used in reviewing legislation infringing on personal liberties. A line of cases dating back to the 1923 opinion by Justice McReynolds in Meyer v. Nebraska, which cited Lochner as establishing limits on the police power, has established a privacy right under substantive due process. More recently, in Roe v. Wade (1973), the Supreme Court held that women have a privacy right to determine whether or not to have an abortion. In Planned Parenthood v. Casey (1992), the Supreme Court reaffirmed that right but no longer used the term "privacy" to describe it. The abortion right was later overruled in Dobbs v. Jackson Women's Health Organization (2022).

Scholarly reaction
The Supreme Court's decision in Lochner v. New York has been criticized by legal scholars. The law professor Bernard Siegan described it as "one of the most condemned cases in United States history." According to the Center for American Progress, a left-leaning thinktank, law professors often use Lochner, along with Plessy v. Ferguson and Korematsu v. United States, as examples of "how judges should not behave."

Lochner is sometimes used as shorthand for extreme right-wing constitutional theory. However, it has come under harsh criticism from conservative and libertarian jurists as well because Lochner embraced substantive due process, a doctrine that was arguably at odds with the original understanding of the Constitution. For example, the conservative legal scholar Robert Bork called the decision an "abomination" and the "quintessence of judicial usurpation of power." Similarly, former Attorney General Edwin Meese said that the Supreme Court "ignored the limitations of the Constitution and blatantly usurped legislative authority." Siegan, a self-described libertarian, described it as "a symbol of judicial dereliction and abuse."

Scholars have noted that when the Fourteenth Amendment was adopted in 1868, 27 of the 37 state constitutions had adopted references to Locke's labor theory of property, which typically said: "All men are by nature free and independent, and have certain inalienable rights, among which are those of enjoying and defending life and liberty, acquiring and possessing and protecting property: and pursuing and obtaining safety and happiness." As such clauses were "deeply rooted in American history and tradition," they likely informed the original meaning of the scope and nature of the fundamental rights protected by the Fourteenth Amendment in the eyes of Lochner-era justices.

However, the decision also has attracted libertarian defenders: the Cato Institute and the scholars Richard Epstein and Randy Barnett, who argue that it correctly protected economic liberty.

Barnett has argued that the decision was basically correct in its presumption in favor of liberty of contract and that the decision was wrong only by perpetuating the misinterpretation of the Fourteenth Amendment that had been established in the Slaughter-House Cases. According to Barnett, the liberty of contract is properly found in the Privileges or Immunities Clause, not in the Due Process Clause of the Fourteenth Amendment. David Bernstein, in Rehabilitating Lochner: Defending Individual Rights Against Progressive Reform, has argued that Lochner was well grounded in Supreme Court precedent and that its emphasis on limits to the states' police powers informed the Supreme Court's early civil liberties and civil rights cases.

See also

 Anticanon
 List of United States Supreme Court cases, volume 198
 Slaughterhouse Cases, 
 Munn v. Illinois, 
 Mugler v. Kansas, 
 Allgeyer v. Louisiana, 
 Adkins v. Children's Hospital, 261 U.S. 525 (1923) case about the minimum wage

References

Citations

Works cited

External links
 
 Summary of Lochner v. New York
 "Supreme Court Landmark Case Lochner v. New York" from C-SPAN's Landmark Cases: Historic Supreme Court Decisions

1905 in New York (state)
1905 in United States case law
20th-century American trials
Baking
Legal history of New York (state)
United States labor case law
United States substantive due process case law
United States Supreme Court cases
United States Supreme Court cases of the Fuller Court
Working time